Dhobini  is a Rural Municipality in Parsa District in the Narayani Zone of southern Nepal. At the time of the 2011 Nepal census it had a population of 4,903 people living in 709 individual households. There were 2,484 males and 2,419 females at the time of census.

References

Populated places in Parsa District
Rural municipalities of Nepal established in 2017
Rural municipalities in Madhesh Province